United States Army Sustainment Command (ASC) is the primary provider of logistics support to units of the United States Army. It is a major subordinate command of United States Army Materiel Command (AMC).

Four types of command authority can be distinguished:
COCOM – combatant command: unitary control (not further delegatable by the combatant commander CCDR)
ADCON – administrative control of the command function of "obtaining resources, direction for training, methods of morale and discipline"
OPCON – operational control of sustainment, a command function, in this case, embodied in an Army Field Support Brigade (AFSB)
TACON – tactical control of sustainment, as embodied in a Contracting Support Brigade

The sustainment function for an Army installation, such as Fort Bliss, and White Sands Missile Range, two contiguous but administratively separate military installations, can be tailored to the situation. In the case of geographically remote locations, logistics can be an additional constraint to be solved, while still providing sustainment to the Army soldier.

Major subordinate units
 279th Army Field Support Brigade (Alabama)
 401st Army Field Support Brigade (Kuwait)
 402nd Field Support Brigade (Hawaii)
 403rd Army Field Support Brigade (Korea)
 404th Army Field Support Brigade (Washington)
 405th Army Field Support Brigade (Germany)
 406th Support Brigade (North Carolina)
 407th Support Brigade (Texas)
 LOGCAP Support Brigade (Illinois)
 Army Reserve Element Illinois

Tactical units
 408th Contracting Support Brigade (Kuwait)
 409th Contracting Support Brigade (Germany)
 410th Contracting Support Brigade (Texas)
 411th Contracting Support Brigade (Korea)
 413th Contracting Support Brigade (Hawaii)
 414th Contracting Support Brigade (Africa & Italy)
 LRC-RIA (Logistics readiness center – Rock Island Arsenal)

List of commanding generals

References

External links

Sustainment
Military units and formations established in 2006